The Argiles d'Octeville (meaning Octeville Clay) is a geological formation in Normandy, France. It dates back to the Kimmeridgian stage of the Late Jurassic. It is equivalent to the Kimmeridge Clay in England and predominantly consists of claystone, with some limestone. It is well exposed in cliff section at Cap de la Hève

Vertebrate fauna

See also

 List of dinosaur-bearing rock formations

References

Jurassic System of Europe
Kimmeridgian Stage

Jurassic France